The 1938 Marquette Golden Avalanche football team was an American football team that represented Marquette University as an independent during the 1938 college football season. In its second season under head coach Paddy Driscoll, the team compiled a 1–7 record and was outscored by a total of 122 to 35. The team played its home games at Marquette Stadium in Milwaukee.

Schedule

References

Marquette
Marquette Golden Avalanche football seasons
Marquette Golden Avalanche football